Cyclone Peter was the wettest tropical cyclone on record in Australia. The third system and first severe tropical cyclone of the 1978–79 season, Peter developed on 29 December from a weak low pressure area over the Gulf of Carpentaria. Peter moved southeastward and deepened while brushing Arnhem Land. Initially a tropical low, it strengthened into a Category 1 cyclone by 12:00 UTC on 29 December. Peter intensified further on 30 December and became a Category 2 cyclone. On the following day, the cyclone peaked with maximum sustained winds of 110 km/h (70 mph). Peter weakened to a Category 1 cyclone before making landfall near the mouth of the Edward River in Queensland. While crossing the Cape York Peninsula, the storm weakened slowly. After reaching Pacific Ocean near Cooktown, the storm decelerated and meandered offshore, but dissipated just offshore on 4 January.

Severe flooding occurred, especially in the Cairns area. The most severe damage was dealt to sugar cane, which suffered 70 to 90 percent destruction. Some flights were canceled at the Cairns Airport due to standing water. Floodwaters forced at least 50 people to flee their homes in Cairns. A number of roads, including major highways, were flooded throughout coastal areas of Far North Queensland. Rainfall and winds also resulted in many power and telephone service outages through the region. There were two fatalities and damage reached approximately $10 million (1979 AUD; $11.4 million 1979 USD).

Meteorological history

During the final week of December 1978, an area of atmospheric convection developed over northern Australia and surrounding areas. During 28 December, an area of low pressure developed over the eastern Arnhem Land within this area of atmospheric convection. Over the next day the system moved northwestward toward the Gulf of Carpentaria and developed further, with the first gale force wind associated with the system reported from an automatic weather station on 29 December. The system was subsequently named Peter by the Australian Bureau of Meteorology (BoM) after it moved into the Gulf and developed into a Category 1 tropical cyclone on the Australian tropical cyclone intensity scale. After being named, Peter continued to intensify further as it tracked southeastward toward the Cape York Peninsula.

Several hours later, the system made landfall between Aurukun and the Edward River mission, Queensland, at around 20:00 (Australian Eastern Standard Time, 11:00 UTC). Over the next couple of days the system gradually weakened over land, before it emerged into the Coral Sea near Cooktown, Queensland, on 1 January. The system subsequently weakened below tropical cyclone intensity and became a tropical low during 2 January. The system was last noted on the following day as it degenerated into a complex low pressure system and moved back over the Cape York Peninsula. The complex low subsequently moved westwards over the Peninsula and into the Gulf, where it developed into Tropical Cyclone Greta.

Impact

The Darwin Tropical Cyclone Warning Centre (TCWC) in Northern Territory issued a cyclone warning on 30 December for the coast of Arnhem Land from the Wessel Islands to Port Roper, located near the mouth of the Roper River. Although a cyclone warning indicates expectation of landfall, Peter would never strike Northern Territory. Very rough seas were reported along the coast of some areas, beaching a  fishing vessel onto the rocks at Gove harbour.

In Queensland, the Brisbane TCWC issued cyclone watches and flood warnings as the storm passed over the Cape York Peninsula. The storm dropped very heavy rainfall while drifting offshore Queensland, with Mount Bellenden Ker recording  over a period of approximately three days, making Peter the wettest tropical cyclone in Australia. About  of that fell in a 24-hour period, which was the country's highest daily rainfall total.

Due to the heavy rainfall, severe flooding occurred, mostly between Tully and Cooktown, with the worst impact in the Cairns area. Many creeks and rivers, such as the Herbert, the north and south branches of the Johnstone, and McLeod rivers overflowed or reached dangerous levels. Much of the damage in North Queensland occurred to newly planted sugar cane, with approximately 70 to 90 percent of area's crop destroyed. Twenty growers in Goondi each lost between $20,000 to $30,000 in sugar cane. Damage to this crop was comparable to the floods in 1977. In total, the storm destroyed 270,000 to 315,000 tonnes of sugar cane.

Standing water at Cairns Airport led Ansett Australia to cancel some flights. Portions of many roads, including major highways such as the Bruce, Captain Cook, Gillies, and Kennedy highways were reported by the Royal Automobile Club as closed due to inundation and washouts. Many motorists were left stranded by floodwaters on Bruce Highway. Emergency personnel crews were put on standby in Innisfail as water up to  threatened dozens of homes in the eastern part of town. In Cairns, over 50 people fled their homes. On 5 January, the Coast Guard of Australia began evacuating some 160 stranded campers in areas about 140 km (85 mi) north of Mossman. Foods shortages occurred in some areas of Far North Queensland, forcing several emergency food drops, including to about 250 people on 4 January and 70 people on 5 January. Additionally, a policeman was winched by helicopter to deliver food supplies to 10 isolated people on 7 January in Goldsborough, which is located in the Gillies Range to the west of Gordonvale. Overall, Peter left two fatalities and about $10 million (1979 AUD) in damage, at least $4.5 million of which was done to sugar cane in Babinda, Innisfail, and Tully.

After the storm, the Government of Queensland declared the Cairns area as a natural disaster area. About week later, the Cabinet supported a measure by Minister for Primary Industries, Vic Sullivan, to offer low-interest loans to farmer who lost significant amounts of crops and livestock. Later, Queensland Premier Joh Bjelke-Petersen requested aid from the national government. Prime Minister Malcolm Fraser approved low-interest loans up to $25,000 (1979 AUD) for small businesses and the implementation of other measures for recovery.

See also

 Other storms of the same name
 List of wettest tropical cyclones
 Floods in Australia
 Cyclone Rona–Frank

References

External links
Bureau of Meteorology – Previous Tropical Cyclones

1978–79 Australian region cyclone season
Peter
1978 in Australia
1979 in Australia
Peter
Floods in Queensland
Peter